The 1920 Cleveland Indians season was the 20th season in franchise history. The Indians won the American League pennant and proceeded to win their first World Series title in the history of the franchise. Pitchers Jim Bagby, Stan Coveleski and Ray Caldwell combined to win 75 games. Despite the team's success, the season was perhaps more indelibly marked by the death of starting shortstop Ray Chapman, who died after being hit by a pitch on August 16.

Regular season

During the season, Jim Bagby became the last pitcher to win 30 games in one season for the Indians in the 20th century.

On August 17, shortstop Ray Chapman died after being hit by a pitch in a game against the Yankees, becoming the second of only two Major League Baseball players to have died as a result of an injury received in a game (the first was Mike "Doc" Powers in 1909).

Season standings

Record vs. opponents

Roster

Player stats

Batting

Starters by position
Note: Pos = Position; G = Games played; AB = At bats; H = Hits; Avg. = Batting average; HR = Home runs; RBI = Runs batted in

Other batters
Note: G = Games played; AB = At bats; H = Hits; Avg. = Batting average; HR = Home runs; RBI = Runs batted in

Pitching

Starting pitchers
Note: G = Games pitched; IP = Innings pitched; W = Wins; L = Losses; ERA = Earned run average; SO = Strikeouts

Relief pitchers
Note: G = Games pitched; IP = Innings pitched; W = Wins; L = Losses; SV = Saves; ERA = Earned run average; SO = Strikeouts

1920 World Series 

On October 10, 1920, which was the fifth game of the World Series, Bill Wambsganss of the Indians executed an unassisted triple play. He caught a line drive, touched second base, and tagged the runner coming from first base. On the same day, Elmer Smith hit the first grand slam in World Series history. During that same game, Indians pitcher Jim Bagby became the first pitcher to hit a home run in World Series history.

AL Cleveland Indians (5) vs. NL Brooklyn Robins (2)

Game 1
October 5, 1920, at Ebbets Field in Brooklyn, New York

Game 2
October 6, 1920, at Ebbets Field in Brooklyn, New York

Game 3
October 7, 1920, at Ebbets Field in Brooklyn, New York

Game 4
October 9, 1920, at Dunn Field in Cleveland, Ohio

Game 5
October 10, 1920, at Dunn Field in Cleveland, Ohio

Game 6
October 11, 1920, at Dunn Field in Cleveland, Ohio

Game 7
October 12, 1920, at Dunn Field in Cleveland, Ohio

Composite box
1920 World Series (5–2): Cleveland Indians (A.L.) over Brooklyn Robins (N.L.)

References

External links
1920 Cleveland Indians team page at Baseball Reference
1920 Cleveland Indians team page at www.baseball-almanac.com
1920 WS page at Baseball Reference

Cleveland Guardians seasons
Cleveland Indians
American League champion seasons
World Series champion seasons
Cleveland Indians